Jonas Vollmer (born in Erlangen, Germany) is a German interaction and industrial design manager and Director User Experience Design at Siemens Healthcare. Prior to September 2015, he was Vice President Design Strategy for TEAMS Design in Esslingen. Until summer 2013, he was key principle of TEAMS Design Shanghai Co., Ltd. in Shanghai, China.  He is best known for his award-winning work for Siemens, Spirella, Intel, Bissell, and Bosch.  Vollmer is co-founder of the Shanghai office of Teams. He has been instrumental in keeping many long-term relationships alive with companies such as Bosch and Siemens and establish new ones to companies such as Intel, Dell and brands ranging from the sports industry to medical. Before joining Siemens he has been managing large user experience innovation and brand strategy programs for Skil, Bissell, Dell and Wik.

History
Vollmer studied industrial design at the HfG Schwaebisch Gmuend in Baden-Württemberg, Germany and business administration (MBA) at the Mannheim Business School and Tongji University.  He designed for TEAMS Design GmbH in Esslingen for 3 years before he opened the Shanghai office in January 2006.  Today he continues to be actively contributing to the design culture.  Vollmer is also regularly asked to contribute articles and lecture at neighboring universities in addition to writing articles. Vollmer worked with the Chinese design community to establish a China chapter, the first chapter of IDSA to be founded outside of the US.  He was serving as the IDSA China Chapter Vice Chair until summer 2013. Since September 2015 he works for Siemens Healthcare in Erlangen, Germany, as Director User Experience Design. At Siemens, Vollmer is responsible for strategically harmonizing and developing the hardware and software product portfolio experience while increasing productivity within and through design.

Personal life
Vollmer currently lives in Erlangen, Germany, with his wife, Vanessa and their children, Anita and Adrian.

Design Awards
Vollmer and his teams have collected over 40 awards during his career. Here are some of the awards from the beginning of his career:

2006
Red Dot
 Siemens Synco Living
 Silit ‘Tasty’

2007
Red Dot
 Bosch GSH 16
 Kaercher Vacuum cleaner

2008
iF China Award
 Intel Classmate PC

2009
Appliance Design Excellence in Design Award
 Intel Classmate PC 

2010 
Red Star Gold 
 GSB 19
Red Star Originality 
 Intel Classmate Tablet
Red Star Excellent: 
 Bosch drill PC
iF China: 
 Intel Classmate Tablet PC

References

Patents
 patents 1
 patents 2
  patents 3

External links
 TEAMS Design

German industrial designers
1979 births
Living people